The  is an archaeological site with ruins of a Nara period to early Heian period government administrative complex located in what is now part of the town of Kami in Kami District, Miyagi prefecture in the Tōhoku region of far northern Honshu, Japan. The site was proclaimed a National National Historic Site in January 1999.The site was excavated in 1986. It is roughly contemporary with  Taga Castle to the southeast.

Background
In the late Nara period, after the establishment of a centralized government under the Ritsuryō system, the Yamato court sent a number of military expeditions to what is now the Tōhoku region of northern Japan to bring the local Emishi tribes under its control. Per the Shoku Nihongi, following a huge earthquake in the year 715 AD, a large number of people migrated to this area from the southern Kantō region, forming numerous fortified settlements.

Description
The ruins are located on a plateau at the southeast end of a group of hills extending from the Ōu Mountains towards the Osaki plains of northern Miyagi Prefecture. The site consists of the remnants of a fortified square enclosure, approximately 300 meters east-west by 250 meters north-south, with an earthen rampart, presumably surmounted by a wooden palisade. Inside the outer enclosure was an inner enclosure protected by an earthen wall 57 meters east-west by 58 meters north-south, with post holes and foundation stones indicating the locations of political affairs and ceremonial buildings, and numerous granaries for storing tax rice. This was a typical layout for local government administrative complexes built per the dictates of the Ritsuryō administration.  It was built in the middle of the first half of the 8th century and was abandoned in the middle of the 10th century. 

The site was backfilled after excavation, and there is now nothing to be seen at the site today except for a commemorative stone marker .It is located about 30 minutes by car from Furukawa IC on the Tohoku Expressway.

See also
Taga Castle
List of Historic Sites of Japan (Miyagi)
Sanjusangendō Kanga ruins

References

External links
https://www.pref.miyagi.jp/site/sitei/kuni-siseki31.html Miyagi Prefectural Agency for Cultural Affairs] 
Kami Town official home page 

History of Miyagi Prefecture
Nara period
Heian period
Kami, Miyagi
Archaeological sites in Japan
Historic Sites of Japan
Mutsu Province